Jared Presson Stroud (born July 10, 1996) is an American professional soccer player who plays as a winger for Major League Soccer club St. Louis City.

Youth and college soccer
Stroud grew up in Chester Borough, New Jersey and played high school soccer at the Delbarton School. He played four years of college soccer at Colgate University between 2014 and 2017. A three time All-Patriot League pick and two-time All-Region honoree, Stroud etched his name into the Colgate record books during his four-year career. Stroud set single-season (13) and career (30) assists records during his senior season to help lead Colgate to its first-ever Sweet 16 appearance. He earned Patriot League Tournament MVP honors as a senior after guiding the Raiders to their second-straight league title in 2017.

Stroud finished his career in the Maroon and White with 50 points behind 10 goals and a school-record 30 assists. The four-year starter earned first team All-Patriot League honors as a junior and senior after collecting second team plaudits as a sophomore. He earned All-Region honors in each of his last two seasons. Stroud guided the Raiders to two Patriot League Tournament championships, one regular-season championship and the program's first-ever NCAA Tournament wins during his time at Colgate.

While with the Raiders, Stroud also appeared for Premier Development League side New York Red Bulls U-23.

Professional career

New York Red Bulls
On January 21, 2018, Stroud was drafted in the fourth round (83rd overall) of the 2018 MLS SuperDraft by New York Red Bulls. On March 15, 2018, Stroud signed with New York Red Bulls II of the United Soccer League. Stroud was named to the league's team of the week bench for his performance on June 9, 2018, in which he recorded his fifth assist of the season in a 4–2 victory over Charlotte Independence. On July 13, 2018. Stroud scored the first three goals of his professional career in a 5–1 victory over Richmond Kickers. On July 28 he opened the scoring for New York in a 2–2 draw with Tampa Bay Rowdies. Stroud ended his first season at the club scoring 7 goals and providing a team leading 11 assists.

Stroud had another strong season with New York Red Bulls II in 2019 scoring a team leading 15 goals and 9 assists. At the conclusion of the season he was named to the USL Championship All-League First Team.

On January 7, 2020, Stroud made the move to the New York Red Bulls first team roster in MLS.

Austin FC
On December 15, 2020, Stroud was selected by Austin FC in the 2020 MLS Expansion Draft. On November 3, 2021, Stroud scored his first MLS goal for Austin FC against Sporting Kansas City. After initially having his contract option declined at the end of the 2021 season, Stroud re-signed with the club on December 17, 2021.

St Louis City SC
On November 7, he was traded to St. Louis City SC in exchange for $100,000 of General Allocation Money.

Career statistics

References

External links 
 
 
 Colgate Profile

1996 births
Living people
American soccer players
Austin FC players
Delbarton School alumni
People from Chester Borough, New Jersey
Soccer players from New Jersey
Sportspeople from Morris County, New Jersey
USL League Two players
Colgate Raiders men's soccer players
New York Red Bulls U-23 players
New York Red Bulls draft picks
New York Red Bulls II players
New York Red Bulls players
USL Championship players
Association football midfielders
Major League Soccer players